dinnerladies is a British sitcom that was created and written by Victoria Wood. It was broadcast on BBC One in the United Kingdom, and ran for two series from 1998 to 2000, totalling sixteen episodes.

The programme depicts the day-to-day lives of staff in the canteen of a factory in Manchester, and the developing relationship between Brenda Furlong (Wood) and canteen manager Tony Martin (Andrew Dunn), as well as their colleagues: prudish Dolly Bellfield (Thelma Barlow) and her friend Jean (Anne Reid), snarky Twinkle (Maxine Peake), ditzy Anita (Shobna Gulati) and maintenance man Stan Meadowcroft (Duncan Preston). Celia Imrie and Julie Walters also appear as HR manager Philippa and Bren's mother respectively. Although the show features many other secondary characters, scenes never take place outside the canteen set, with other situations either being described by characters or (in the penultimate and final episodes) watched by the characters on a television.

The first series of six episodes began airing on 12 November 1998 and ended on 17 December 1998; the second, which had ten episodes, aired from 25 November 1999 to 27 January 2000; Wood deliberately ended the show after two series, citing the short run and quality of Fawlty Towers as one of her reasons for doing so. The show was filmed in a traditional American sitcom style with a multiple-camera setup and before a live studio audience. It is now repeated on Gold, and has been released on DVD. The first series won the 1999 Rose d'Or Press Award and "Best New TV Comedy" at the 1999 British Comedy Awards, and the second won "Best TV Comedy" in 2000.

Series overview

Episodes

Series 1 (1998)

Series 2 (1999–2000)
Each episode of the second series is set on a specific date which appears as a caption at the beginning of the episode, to put the progress of various storylines into perspective.

Ratings

References

External links
 

BBC-related lists
dinnerladies episodes, List of